Central Public Library may refer to:

Central Public Library (Dhaka), the largest public library in Bangladesh
Central Public Library of Serres
Central Public Library (Washington, D.C.), United States